Callum King-Harmes (born 19 April 2002) is a professional footballer who plays as a midfielder for Bromsgrove Sporting.

Club career
In 2018, after spending his schoolboy career with Wolverhampton Wanderers, King-Harmes joined Bolton Wanderers. On 3 August 2019, following financial problems forcing the club to utilise youth players, King-Harmes made his debut for Bolton in a 2–0 loss against Wycombe Wanderers. He signed his first professional contract with Bolton Wanderers on 15 May 2020, penning a one-year deal. On 31 August 2020, King-Harmes joined team mate George Thomason on loan at Bamber Bridge having already played for them during Pre-season on trial. His debut for Bamber Bridge came on 19 September in a 1–0 win against Matlock Town. He was only able to play in six matches due to the large amount of matches postponed as a result of the COVID-19 pandemic followed up by the season ending early on 21 February. On 19 May 2021 Bolton announced he would be released at the end of his contract.

On 28 August 2021, King-Harmes signed for Hednesford Town. He made his debut the same day in a 1–1 draw against Biggleswade Town. On 1 October 2021, Callum joined Sutton Coldfield Town FC on dual-registration.

In August 2022, King-Harmes joined Bromsgrove Sporting after impressing on trial.

International career
King-Harmes has represented Wales at under-15 and under-16 level.

Career statistics

Notes

References

2002 births
Living people
Welsh footballers
Footballers from Birmingham, West Midlands
Association football midfielders
Wolverhampton Wanderers F.C. players
Bolton Wanderers F.C. players
Bamber Bridge F.C. players
Hednesford Town F.C. players
Sutton Coldfield Town F.C. players
Bromsgrove Sporting F.C. players
English Football League players
Northern Premier League players
Southern Football League players
Wales youth international footballers